Jordi Samper Montaña (born 23 April 1990) is a Spanish tennis player playing on the ATP Challenger Tour. On 16 September 2013, he reached his highest ATP singles ranking of 211 and his highest doubles ranking of 227 achieved on 23 September 2013.

His only qualification for a Grand Slam tournament was at the French Open in 2016, where he lost in straight sets to French wild card Mathias Bourgue in the first round.

His younger brother, Sergi, is a professional footballer who played for FC Barcelona.

Tour finals

Singles

Doubles

References

External links
 
 

1990 births
Living people
Spanish male tennis players
Tennis players from Barcelona